Crasimorpha infuscata is a moth of the family Gelechiidae. It was first described by Ronald W. Hodges in 1964. It is native to Brazil, but was purposely introduced to Hawaii in 1960 and 1961 to control Christmasberry. It seems the moth did not become established however.

The male has a small yellow subcostal brush on the hindwing.

The larvae feed on Schinus terebinthifolius. They bore into the terminal parts of the host and form galls. The larval attack thus reduces flowering and seed formation.

External links

Moths described in 1964
Chelariini
Lepidoptera used as pest control agents